Columbine is census-designated place (CDP) in and governed by Jefferson and Arapahoe counties in Colorado, United States. The CDP is a part of the Denver–Aurora–Lakewood, CO Metropolitan Statistical Area. Located primarily in Jefferson County, Columbine lies immediately south of Denver. The population of the Columbine CDP was 24,280 at the United States Census 2010. The community lies in ZIP code 80123.

History

Columbine grew rapidly during the Space Race years from 1958 to 1968 with the construction of the Martin Company missile facility in Waterton Canyon. Its population exceeded 20,000 for the first time in 1980.

Columbine was the site of the Columbine High School massacre in 1999 perpetrated by Eric Harris and Dylan Klebold.

Geography
Columbine is located on the eastern edge of Jefferson County with a small portion extending east into Arapahoe County. Columbine is bordered to the east by Littleton and Columbine Valley, and to the west by Ken Caryl.

Demographics

Education
The portion of Columbine in Jefferson County is served by the Jefferson County Public Schools.
 Zoned elementary schools: Columbine Hills, Dutch Creek, Leawood, and Normandy
 Ken Caryl Middle School
 Columbine High School
The portion of Columbine in Arapahoe County is served by the Littleton Public Schools.

See also

 List of census-designated places in Colorado
 Front Range Urban Corridor

References

External links

 Jefferson County website
 Jeffco Public Schools
 Columbine High School
 Arapahoe County website
 Littleton Public Schools

Census-designated places in Jefferson County, Colorado
Census-designated places in Arapahoe County, Colorado
Census-designated places in Colorado
Denver metropolitan area